The Korimako Stream is a stream in the North Island of New Zealand, located in the northern suburbs of the national capital, Wellington. It rises in Khandallah and Ngaio and is the Kaiwharawhara Stream's main tributary.  The two meet in the lower reaches of the Kaiwharawhara River in parkland.

References

Rivers of the Wellington Region
Rivers of New Zealand